USS Fidelity (AM-96) was an  of the United States Navy. Laid down on 15 October 1941 by the Nashville Bridge Company of Nashville, Tennessee, launched on 28 February 1942, and commissioned on 9 September 1942. The ship was reclassified as a submarine chaser USS PC-1600 on 1 June 1944.

PC-1600 was decommissioned, (date unknown), and transferred to the Maritime Commission on 15 June 1948, and sold to Charles Weaver. Struck from the Naval Register, (date unknown). Fate unknown. PC-1600 earned two battle stars for World War II service.

References

External links
 

 

Adroit-class minesweepers
Ships built in Tennessee
1942 ships
World War II minesweepers of the United States
World War II patrol vessels of the United States